John Christopher Murray  (born June 1978) is Professor of Robotics and the Academic Dean for the Faculty of Technology at the University of Sunderland, he was previously Professor of Autonomous Systems and Head of Computer Science at the University of Hull. He was previously at the University of Lincoln. He received his BSc from Aberystwyth University and his PhD from the University of Sunderland.

Murray has spent the majority of his academic career working in the field of robotics, notably in Human–robot interaction where he has developed several models of interaction processes to allow for Humans and Robots to work alongside one another, particularly in how Cognitive bias play a role in this interaction.

Selected publications
 Atanbori J, Dickinson P, Duan W, Murray J, Appiah K and Shaw E, "Automatic classification of bird species using Computer Vision techniques", Pattern Recognition Letters (2016)
 Biswas M and Murray J, "The Effects of Cognitive Biases and Imperfectness in Long-term Robot-Human Companionship: Case Studies using Five biases on Humanoid Robot", Cognitive Systems Research (2016)
 Biswas M and Murray J, "Can Cognitive biases in Robots make more ‘Likeable’ Human-Robot Interactions than the Robots without such Biases: Case Studies using Five Biases on Humanoid Robot", International Journal of Artificial Life Research (2017)
 Frohnwieser A, Pike T, Murray J and Wilkinson A, "Lateralised eye use towards video stimuli in bearded dragons", Animal Behaviour and Cognition, ISSN 2372-5052 (2017)
 Frohnwieser A, Pike T, Murray J and Wilkinson A, "Perception of artificial conspecifics by Bearded Dragons (Pogona Vitticeps)", Integrative Zoology (2018)

References

External links

Living people
1978 births
Academics of the University of Hull
Roboticists
British scientists
Academics of the University of Lincoln
Alumni of the University of Sunderland
Alumni of Aberystwyth University
Fellows of the Higher Education Academy